Evagoras Pallikarides (26 February 1938 – 14 March 1957) was a Greek-Cypriot poet and revolutionary who was a member of EOKA during the 1955–1959 campaign against British rule in Cyprus. He was arrested on 18 December 1956 when he was caught carrying weaponry (a Bren machine gun and crates of ammunition) on a donkey, to which he confessed in his trial. He was sentenced to death by hanging for firearms possession on 27 February 1957 and was the youngest insurgent to be executed in Cyprus. His death generated widespread controversy due to his young age and the circumstances of his arrest.   

Propaganda leaflets published and distributed after the hanging included a fabricated description of how he had murdered a traitor. The lawfulness of his execution has been subsequently questioned in light of the fact that the weapon he held at the time was not functional. In the A. W. B. Simpson book Human Rights and the End of Empire, Simpson claims that the real reason for Pallikarides' execution was that the authorities believed (but were unable to prove) that he had earlier murdered an elderly individual who was a suspected collaborator with the British authorities.

Biography

Early Years
Evagoras Pallikarides was born in the village of Tsada in Paphos. He was the fourth and youngest child of the Pallikarides family of farmers.

Participation in the Elizabeth II Coronation revolts
In March and April 1953, during the preparations for Elizabeth II's coronation (due in June), Union Jack flags were raised in the city of Paphos. The locals were enraged and multiple protests were organized. These were mostly peaceful in nature until in an April 1st protest in the school of Jacob 15-year old Evagoras climbed on the mast and took down the flag, tearing it along with his classmates. This kickstarted liberation riots along the entirety of Paphos, which were however ignored by the police by orders of the Governor who wished to avoid bloodshed in honor of the queen's coronation. Evagoras was arrested but subsequently released. During the period of celebration in June, no public celebrations took place in Paphos.

Participation in EOKA and second arrest
In the age of 17, Evagoras joined the EOKA as a junior member. In November 17th 1955, he participated in a student riot intended as a distraction for an EOKA attack, which ultimately never took place. Evagoras was arrested and accused of organizing civil unrest, which he denied. The trial was postponed for December.

Third arrest and trial
In December 18th, Evagoras and two adult members of the EOKA were transporting weapons (a Bren submachine gun and two caches of ammunition) for an impending attack, when they encountered a British patrol. The adults managed to escape but Evagoras was arrested. During the investigation it was revealed that he had troubled authorities twice in the past, and he was formally accused of participating in EOKA and smuggling illegal ammunition. During his trial, in February 25th, he confessed to his crimes stating "I know you will sentence me to death, but whatever I did, I did as a Cypriot who wants his liberty."

Involvement of the Greek Government
The next day of the trial, the students of the Paphos High school abstained from their classes and asked Governor John Harding to pardon Evagoras. News reached the Greek government that immediately took diplomatic action to rescue Evagoras. Representatives of the Greek Parliament telegraphed the House of Lords and the United Nations, while citizen and Cyprus church committees requested the intervention of the Queen. Of note, US senator Fulton was also involved in these attempts. The Crown, however, refused to offer amnesty to Evagoras and Harding refused to pardon him.

Execution and burial
Evagoras was executed by hanging in March 14th, 1957. British authorities buried him in the "Imprisoned Marbles" graveyard in the prison of Nicosia so as to prevent his funeral from generating civil unrest.

Legacy
Evagoras remains the youngest EOKA insurgent to be executed by the British government. He is also the last insurgent to be executed in Cyprus. His execution during the Cyprus Emergency, just before the libération from British rule, remains a "dark spot in the history of Cyprus" and negatively affects Cyprus' relationship with the Crown, which many see as a force that could have averted the tragedies but refused to intervene. In Queen Elizabeth II's first and only visit in Cyprus in 1997 protesters waved National flags decorated with mourning black ribbons in remembrance of the executed guerrillas, while relatives of the executed built a mock gallows in the main city square and distributed leaflets with the queen's picture saying "wanted for killing of freedom fighters".  

Cyprus Football Club Evagoras, established after Cyprus gained its independence in 1960, was named after him. It was later merged with another club to become AEP Paphos.

References

1957 deaths
Cypriot people of the EOKA
executed Cypriot people
executed revolutionaries
Greek revolutionaries
people executed by British Cyprus by hanging
people executed by the British military by hanging
people from Paphos District
people killed in the Cyprus Emergency